Émmanuel Ducher (8 April 1971 – 28 January 2013) was a French water polo player. He competed in the men's tournament at the 1992 Summer Olympics.

References

External links
 

1971 births
2013 deaths
French male water polo players
Olympic water polo players of France
Water polo players at the 1992 Summer Olympics
Sportspeople from Val-d'Oise